Marco Antonio Rosa Furtado Júnior (born 1 October 1997), known as Marco Antônio, is a Brazilian footballer who plays as a midfielder for Atlético Goianiense, on loan from Bahia.

Career statistics

Honours
Botafogo
 Campeonato Brasileiro Série B: 2021

Bahia
Campeonato Baiano: 2018, 2019, 2020

References

External links

1997 births
Living people
Brazilian footballers
Sportspeople from Belém
Association football midfielders
Campeonato Brasileiro Série A players
Campeonato Brasileiro Série B players
Esporte Clube Bahia players
Botafogo de Futebol e Regatas players
Atlético Clube Goianiense players